Mobin Mohan is an Indian novelist who writes in the Malayalam language. He is a recipient of the Kendra Sahitya Akademi Yuva award of 2021.
He was born in 1988 at Kanchiyar, Idukki district. His grandfather migrated to Idukki from Kottayam in 1944. He was born as the son of NG Mohanan and Sobhana. He completed his education from St Mary's  School Kanchiyar, St Mary's school Marykulam, St Jerome's HSS Vellamkudy, college of applied science Kattappana. He was a lecturer of St Sebastian's college, Kattappana. He worked as the District Project coordinator of Kerala cultural department.He is a general council member of Kerala Sahithya Akademi member.He is currently working at Munsiff's court Kattappana.

Works
 Aakaasam petta thumpikal (Story Collection) 
 Purambokku (Story Collection )
 Jacaranda (Novel)

Awards

 Kendra sahitya Akademi Yuva Award 2021 for Jacaranda (novel)
 Book cafe - Akbar Kakkattil award 
 Nalanda Puraskaram
 Kolumban Kadha Puraskaram

References

External links
 Kendra Sahithya Akademi award winners
 Books of Mobin Mohan

Writers from Kerala
Malayalam-language writers
Living people
1988 births
Recipients of the Sahitya Akademi Yuva Puraskar